The  is an annual marathon sporting event in Yamanashi Prefecture, Japan. The first running of the event took place on November 25, 2012.

History 
Prior to 2012 the race had been run 36 times as the "Kawaguchiko Marathon", or "Lake Kawaguchi Marathon". The course consisted of two laps of Lake Kawaguchi. In 2012, both the name of the race and the course were changed, with the route being changed to a single lap around Lake Kawaguchi and the nearby Lake Saiko.

Over 23,000 participants were registered for the inaugural race vs 13,000 participants the year before and organizers failed to take into account the logistics from the additional runners. Traffic backed up and over 5000 of the registrants were not able to run.

Winners 
Key:

References

External links 
 Mount Fuji Marathon official website

Marathons in Japan
Sport in Yamanashi Prefecture
Recurring sporting events established in 2012
2012 establishments in Japan